
This is a timeline of Slovenian history, comprising important legal and territorial changes and political events in Slovenia and its predecessor states. To read about the background to these events, see History of Slovenia. See also the list of presidents of Slovenia.

third century BC

second century BC

first century BC

first century

second century

third century

fourth century

fifth century

sixth century

seventh century

eighth century

ninth century

10th century

11th century

12th century

13th century

14th century

15th century

16th century

17th century

18th century

19th century

20th century

21st century

See also
 Timeline of Ljubljana

References

Bibliography

External links
 

Slovene
Slovenia history-related lists
Years in Slovenia